Bledzewka  is a settlement in the administrative district of Gmina Bledzew, within Międzyrzecz County, Lubusz Voivodeship, in western Poland. Bledzewka has a population of 6.

References

Bledzewka